The 2023 SGB Cab Direct Championship season will be the 76th season of the second tier of British Speedway and the 6th known as the SGB Championship. The British Speedway Network (BSN) would stream 35 matches live for the second year running.

Summary
Nine clubs will compete in the Championship in 2023, with Edinburgh Monarchs remaining in the league despite problems surrounding their home venue. The only change to the league is Leicester Lions, who left for the higher league of the SGB Premiership 2023.

The league format will be the same as in 2022, with each team racing against each other twice (home and away), meaning a total of 16  fixtures each during the season. The points system has been revamped and simplified, with teams scoring two points for a win (home or away), with a bonus point scored for an aggregate win. A 'Super Heat' has also been introduced in the event of a tied meeting, with the winners scoring two league points and the losers gaining one point. 

The top six teams will again qualify for the playoffs, however they will be split into two groups of three, with the winners of each qualifying for the Grand Final. Finally, the points limit for team construction was reduced from 42 to 40 points.

Poole Pirates will be looking to secure an unprecedented third consecutive double of league and cup.

League

Regular season
League table

Fixtures & Results

Grand Final
First leg

Second leg

Knockout Cup
The 2023 SGB Championship Knockout Cup will be the 55th edition of the Knockout Cup for tier two teams and the 6th edition under the SGB Championship Knockout Cup name.

Bracket

Home team scores are in bold
Overall aggregate scores are in red

Final
First Leg

Second Leg

BSN Series

Scottish Group

Fixtures

Table

Northern Group

Fixtures

Table

Southern Group

Fixtures

Table

Pairs Championship
The 2023 edition of the SGB Championship Pairs will take place on Friday 1 September, at Oxford Stadium, Oxford.

Riders Championship
The 2023 edition of the SGB Championship Riders Championship will take place on Sunday 22 August, at Ecco Arena, Redcar.

Squads

Berwick Bandits

 (C)

Birmingham Brummies

 (C)

Edinburgh Monarchs

 
 

 (C)

Glasgow Tigers

 (C)

Oxford Cheetahs

 (C)

Plymouth Gladiators

 (C)

Poole Pirates

 (C)

Redcar Bears

 (C)

Scunthorpe Scorpions

 (C)

See also
List of United Kingdom speedway league champions
Knockout Cup (speedway)

References

SGB Championship
SGB Championship
SGB Championship